By the Sad Sea Waves is a 1917 American short comedy film featuring Harold Lloyd.

Plot
Trying to woo Bebe on a beach, Harold impersonates a life guard.  Among his misadventures, Harold is wrongly credited with saving two male swimmers from drowning but he eventually does rescue Bebe.

Cast
 Harold Lloyd 
 Snub Pollard 
 Bebe Daniels 
 Frank Alexander as Bather
 William Blaisdell
 Sammy Brooks
 Rudolph Bylek
 Billy Fay (as William Fay)
 Florence Gibson
 Clyde E. Hopkins
 Oscar Larson
 Gus Leonard
 Vivian Marshall
 Belle Mitchell
 Fred C. Newmeyer
 Dorothea Wolbert (as Dorothy Wolbert)

See also
 List of American films of 1917
 Harold Lloyd filmography

References

External links

 By the Sad Sea Waves on YouTube

1917 films
American silent short films
1917 comedy films
1917 short films
American black-and-white films
Films directed by Alfred J. Goulding
Silent American comedy films
Articles containing video clips
American comedy short films
Surviving American silent films
1910s American films
1910s English-language films